Hans Howaldt (12 November 1888, Kiel – 6 September 1970) was a successful and highly decorated German U-boat commander in the Kaiserliche Marine during World War I and also active in World War II. By the end of World War I he was promoted Kapitänleutnant.

As a sportsman, Hans Howaldt won Bronze in the international 8 Metre class sailing at the 1936 Summer Olympics on the Bay of Kiel as skipper of Germania III, a keelboat designed and built by Abeking & Rasmussen and owned by crew-member Alfried Krupp von Bohlen und Halbach.

Awards and decorations
 Iron Cross of 1914, 1st and 2nd class
 Hamburg and Lübeck Hanseatic Crosses
 Knight's Cross of the Royal House Order of Hohenzollern with Swords
 Order of the Crown, 4th class (Prussia)
 Pour le Mérite

References
 Howaldt in: Biographisches Lexikon für Schleswig-Holstein und Lübeck, Vol. 12 Neumünster 2006, p. 198 ff.

External links
 treffpunkt-howaldt.de – Howaldt family (in German)
 Wrecked Gefion torpedoed by UB 40
 Wrecked SS Salsette torpedoed by UB 40 

1888 births
1970 deaths
Sportspeople from Kiel
U-boat commanders (Imperial German Navy)
Imperial German Navy personnel of World War I
Kriegsmarine personnel
Recipients of the Pour le Mérite (military class)
Recipients of the Hanseatic Cross (Lübeck)
Sailors at the 1936 Summer Olympics – 8 Metre
Olympic sailors of Germany
Olympic bronze medalists for Germany
German male sailors (sport)
People from the Province of Schleswig-Holstein
Olympic medalists in sailing
Medalists at the 1936 Summer Olympics
Military personnel from Kiel